Ferchaud may refer to:

Martigné-Ferchaud
Claire Ferchaud